Controlling Crowds (Parts I-III) is the sixth studio album by British trip hop progressive and alternative group Archive. It was released worldwide on March 30, 2009.

Release
The album consists of three different parts:
 Part I: Controlling Crowds; Bullets; Words on Signs; Dangervisit; Quiet Time
 Part II: Collapse / Collide; Clones; Bastardised Ink; Kings of Speed; Whore
 Part III: Chaos; Razed to the Ground; Funeral

In the beginning, the band wanted to include a fourth part. It was later released as Controlling Crowds – Part IV on 19 October 2009. Both albums were released on the same day as a double CD under the name Controlling Crowds - The Complete Edition Parts I–IV.

In popular culture
The second song on the album, "Bullets", was used in the January 2013 teaser for CD Projekt Red's game titled Cyberpunk 2077.

Track listing
CD 1 :
 "Controlling Crowds" (10:09)
 "Bullets" (5:54)
 "Words on Signs" (4:00)
 "Dangervisit" (7:37)
 "Quiet Time" (5:55)
 "Collapse/Collide" (9:12)
 "Clones" (5:00)
 "Bastardised Ink" (3:34)
 "Kings of Speed" (4:22)
 "Whore" (4:15)
 "Chaos" (5:28)
 "Razed to the Ground" (5:22)
 "Funeral" (7:19)

CD 2 (limited edition) :
 "Killing All Movement" (6:22)
 "Children They Feed" (3:06)
 "Day That You Go" (3:49)
 "Neatly Folded" (3:18)
 "Bullets" (video)

Charts

Certifications

References

2009 albums
Archive (band) albums
Concept albums